Abduction may refer to:

Media

Film and television
 "Abduction" (The Outer Limits), a 2001 television episode
 "Abduction" (Death Note) a Japanese animation television series
 "Abductions" (Totally Spies!), a 2002 episode of an animated television series
 "The Abduction" (Alias), a 2002 television episode
 "The Abduction" (Dr. Quinn, Medicine Woman), a 1994 television episode
 Abduction (1975 film), directed by Joseph Zito
 Abduction (1997 film), directed by Takao Okawara
 Abduction (2011 film), directed by John Singleton
 Abduction (2019 film), directed by Ernie Barbarash
 Abduction: The Megumi Yokota Story, a 2005 American documentary film
 The Abduction, a 1996 TV movie starring Victoria Principal and Robert Hays

Literature
 Abduction (novel), a 2000 novel by novelist Robin Cook
 Abduction!, a 2004 novel by Peg Kehret
 The Abduction, a 1987 novel (Norwegian title Bortførelsen), written in Norwegian by Mette Newth and translated into English by Steven T. Murray and Tiina Nunnally
 The Abduction, a 1998 novel by J. Robert King

Music
 "Abduction", a 2005 song by Iron Maiden vocalist Bruce Dickinson
 Abduction, a music label run by members of Sun City Girls

Of a person or people 
 Alien abduction, phenomenon of people reporting what they believe to be the real experience of being kidnapped by extraterrestrial beings
 Bride kidnapping, a practice in which a man abducts the woman he wishes to marry
 Child abduction, unauthorized removal of a minor from the custody of their guardians
 Express kidnapping, abduction where a small immediate ransom is demanded
 International child abduction, form of human trafficking
 Kidnapping, unlawful confinement of a person against their will
 Raptio, large scale abduction of women
 Tiger kidnapping, taking a hostage to force a loved one or associate of the victim to do something

Sciences
 Abduction (anatomy), a type of movement which draws a structure or limb away from the median plane of the body
 Abductive reasoning, a method of reasoning in logic

See also
 Abducted (disambiguation)
 Abductor (disambiguation)